The 500 metres speed skating event was part of the speed skating at the 1956 Winter Olympics program. The competition was held on naturally frozen ice on the Lake Misurina. It was held on Saturday, 28 January 1956, and started at noon and ended at 1:15 PM. Forty-seven speed skaters from 17 nations competed.

Medalists

Records
These were the standing world and Olympic records (in seconds) prior to the 1956 Winter Olympics.

(*) The record was set in a high altitude venue (more than 1000 metres above sea level) and on naturally frozen ice.

Yevgeny Grishin equalized his own world record.

Results

Yevgeny Grishin set a new world record only six days before this event on the same venue. He equalized his world record time and won the gold medal.

Johnny Sands and Yuri Mikhaylov did not finish after a fall.

See also

 1956 Winter Olympics

References

External links
Official Olympic Report
 

Speed skating at the 1956 Winter Olympics